Crenicichla monicae is a species of cichlid native to South America. It is found in the lower Rio Uaupés and lower Rio Içana, tributaries of the upper Rio Negro in Brazil.

The fish is named in honor of ichthyologist Mônica Toledo-Piza Ragazzo, whose efforts in publishing, in 2002, Alfred Russel Wallace’s drawings from his 1850-1852 expedition to the Rio Negro and Rio Uaupés region, were a great service to science, and also decisive for identifying this fish as a new species.

References

monicae
Freshwater fish of Brazil
Taxa named by Sven O. Kullander
Taxa named by Henrique Rosa Varella
Fish described in 2015